Shibani Sona Joshi (born October 4, 1975) is a reporter for the Fox Business Network.

Career
Joshi began her journalism career as a news production assistant at CNNfn where she contributed to Lou Dobbs Moneyline and CNN Money Morning.

Joshi was a producer in New York City for Reuters Television and Times Now, the joint venture news channel with The Times of India.  Joshi served as a reporter covering breaking news for News 12 Westchester.

Joshi has also served as the host of ImagineAsian TV's The Pulse variety show, contributed to ABCNews.com and ABC News Now covering technology and business stories, and was a co-host of American Desi's Point of View talk show. From 2004 to 2006, Joshi held the position of Senior Manager in Strategy and Business Development at Disney/ABC Media Networks where she worked on the launch of ABC News Now.

She has been a guest on the Fox News Channel's late-night satire show Red Eye w/ Greg Gutfeld.

Joshi now runs her own website that reports on matters of high technology.

Germany and solar power

Joshi is known for asserting that Germany's advantage over the US in the production of solar power stems from the additional sunlight Germany receives. In response,  Slate.com's Will Oremus noted, "virtually the entirety of the continental United States gets more sun than even the sunniest part of Germany"  Joshi retracted her statement and restated "[I]n fact, the difference come down more to subsidies and political priorities and has nothing to with sunshine."

Family
Joshi is a native of Oklahoma City. Both of her parents are immigrants from India.  Her father, Dileep Joshi, is a retired vice president for manufacturing and engineering at Lucent Technologies. Her mother, Meghana Joshi, was formerly an information technology manager in Norman, Oklahoma at Johnson Controls, Inc.

Joshi was married to Rahul Advani, a principal at Energy Capital Partners, but the couple later divorced.

External links
FoxBusiness.com bio
Marriage announcement in the New York Times

References

Living people
American women journalists
American women writers of Indian descent
Fox Business people
American Hindus
University of Oklahoma alumni
Harvard Business School alumni
1975 births
Writers from Oklahoma City
21st-century American women